McKinley Elevator Corporation is an Irvine, California-based provider of accessibility products in California, Arizona and Nevada. Its products include vertical and incline wheelchair lifts, residential elevators, dumbwaiters and car lifts.

History 

In 1948, McKinley Elevator Corporation was started by Bill McKinley as an equipment distribution company.

Products and services 

McKinley Elevator Corporation specializes in the sales, installation and repair of accessibility lifts and elevators for residential and commercial use. Available products include wheelchair lifts, elevators, stair lifts, car lifts, dumbwaiters and evacuation carriers.

References 

Elevator manufacturers
Manufacturing companies based in Greater Los Angeles
Companies based in Irvine, California
American companies established in 1948
Manufacturing companies established in 1948
1948 establishments in California